White Heat is a 1949 film starring James Cagney.

White Heat may also refer to:

Science
 White heat, one of the colors used to estimate an object's temperature from the color of incandescence, see red heat
 White heat of revolution, a phrase coined by the UK Prime Minister Harold Wilson about the effects of technology

Film, TV and entertainment
 White Heat (1926 film), a British film directed by Thomas Bentley
 White Heat, a 1934 American film directed by Lois Weber
 White Heat (book), a 1990 book by English chef and restaurateur Marco Pierre White
 White Heat (TV series), a 2012 British television drama series

Music
 White Heat (Dusty Springfield album), 1982
 White Heat (Switch album), a 1975 album from R&B group White Heat (aka Switch)
 White Heat (Icehouse album), 2011
 White Light/White Heat, a 1968 album by the Velvet Underground
 "White Heat", song by Madness from 1985 album Mad Not Mad
 "White Light/White Heat" (song), by the Velvet Underground
 "White Heat", a song by Madonna from True Blue
 "White Heat, Red Hot", a song by Judas Priest from Stained Class